Dorota Kwaśna (born 11 September 1972) is a Polish former cross-country skier who competed from 1992 to 2002. Competing in three Winter Olympics, she earned her best career finish of eighth in the 4 × 5 km relay at Lillehammer in 1994 and her best individual finish of 21st in the 5 km + 10 km combined pursuit.

Kwaśna's best finish at the FIS Nordic World Ski Championships was 17th twice (1993: 30 km, 1995: 5 km + 10 km combined pursuit). Her best World Cup finish was 17th in an individual sprint event in Germany in 1996.

Kwaśna's best career finish was third in four FIS races at distances up to 10 km from 1997 to 2001.

Cross-country skiing results
All results are sourced from the International Ski Federation (FIS).

Olympic Games

World Championships

a.  Cancelled due to extremely cold weather.

World Cup

Season standings

References

External links
 
 Women's 4 x 5 km cross-country relay Olympic results: 1976-2002 

1972 births
Cross-country skiers at the 1992 Winter Olympics
Cross-country skiers at the 1994 Winter Olympics
Cross-country skiers at the 1998 Winter Olympics
Living people
Polish female cross-country skiers
Olympic cross-country skiers of Poland
Sportspeople from Bielsko-Biała